Hartell is an unincorporated community in Alberta, Canada within the Foothills County.

External links 
 Listing of hamlets in Foothills County on the official county website, providing a map of Hartell

Localities in Foothills County